Bratčice may refer to places in the Czech Republic:

Bratčice (Brno-Country District), a municipality and village in the South Moravian Region
Bratčice (Kutná Hora District), a municipality and village in the Central Bohemian Region